Hosta sieboldiana, Siebold's plantain lily, is a species of hosta native to Japan. A putative variety, Hosta sieboldiana var. elegans (called the giant blue hosta), has gained the Royal Horticultural Society's Award of Garden Merit, as has a putative variety of its synonym; Hosta fortunei var. aureomarginata, the gold-edged plantain lily. The cultivars 'Blue Angel', 'Blue Mammoth', and 'Olive Bailey Langdon' have also gained the RHS Award of Garden Merit.

Varieties
Two varieties are accepted:

Hosta sieboldiana var. glabra N.Fujita
Hosta sieboldiana var. sieboldiana

References

sieboldiana
Plants described in 1887